Conrad Williams may refer to:
 Conrad Williams (Family Affairs), a fictional character in UK soap opera Family Affairs
 Conrad Williams (athlete) (born 1982), British 400m athlete